The Spanish Civil War was fought from 17 July 1936 till the victory of Francoist Spain on 1 April 1939. After the end of the war, the Spanish Republic formed a government-in-exile in Paris and Mexico City. Between the start of the civil war and Spanish transition to democracy and the reconciliation with the Spanish Republican government in exile in 1977, nations decided when, how, and if they recognised the government of Spain.

Americas

Asia

Europe

Oceania

See also 
 International response to the Spanish Civil War
 Spanish question (United Nations)

References

External links 
 United Nations General Assembly Resolution 32
 United Nations General Assembly Resolution 39

Francoism
Francoist Spain
20th century in Spain
Modern history of Spain
Spain history-related lists
Foreign relations of Spain during the Francoist dictatorship